Arnold Margolin is an American television producer, screen writer, and director. He is the older brother of actor Stuart Margolin.

He was executive producer of Love, American Style, and shared composition credits for the theme song along with Charles Fox.

References

External links

American television producers
American television writers
American male television writers
American television directors
Year of birth missing (living people)
Living people
Place of birth missing (living people)